The Elvian School was a private school in Reading, Berkshire, United Kingdom run by the Licensed Trade Charity as a co-educational, non-denominational Christian school. It was previously the Roman Catholic boys' school Presentation College, Reading, until it went into administration in 2004. In March 2010 it was announced that the school would close at the end of the academic year.

History
The school opened in 1931 as Presentation College, Reading, an independent boys' day school run by the Presentation Brothers. In May 2003, the Presentation Brothers made the highly controversial decision to close the school the following summer. However, due to the "Save Pres" campaign by staff and students, the Presentation Brothers reversed the decision and the school was transferred to a trust. However, in mid-2004 the school went into administration and was taken over by the Licensed Trade Charity and became the Elvian School. The final headteacher of the school was Paul Bevis.

On Sunday, 14 June 2009, one of the school's students, 15-year-old Nicholas Rice, died in an air collision incident over Sutton Courtenay, Oxfordshire. His Grob Tutor aeroplane collided with a civilian glider, during an Air Experience Flight. The pilot of the Grob Tutor, 62-year-old Michael Blee, was also killed, while the pilot of the glider, Henry Freeborn, parachuted to safety and survived.

Closure
In January 2010, staff and parents of pupils were sent letters stating that the future of Elvian School was unclear and that the feasibility of continuing to operate was being considered during a consultation period. On 3 March, a further letter and announcement by the school's director of education, Ian Mullins, stated that the consultation had unanimously agreed that the school could not run into the 2010/11 academic year. The school closed in July 2010.

Rebirth
In 2013 members of the West Reading Education Network WREN announced plans to open a Free School on the site of the former Elvian School, re-using some of the Elvian school buildings. These plans were delayed whilst developers Taylor Wimpey agreed to purchase the site subject to obtaining planning permission for 182 homes. Planning permission was refused. Taylor Wimpey appealed the refusal, and their appeal was dismissed in December 2013 after a public enquiry. Taylor Wimpey appealed to the High Court for a judicial review of the refusal, which was dismissed in June 2014.  The new school opened with the name "The Wren School" in 2015.

Curriculum
The school offered a broad curriculum and included all the subjects of the National Curriculum.

Notable former pupils

Old Presentonians
Michael Bond OBE – children's author
Gerard Johnson – rock musician.
Joseph Kelly – Catholic Newspaper editor and publisher.
Cormac Murphy-O'Connor – Roman Catholic cardinal.
Damian Thompson – journalist and author.
Mike Oldfield – rock musician.
Lawrie Sanchez – football player and manager.
Jonathan Bowden – Nationalist political philosopher.

See also
Licensed Victuallers' School

References

External links
Elvian School

Educational institutions established in 1931
Defunct Catholic schools in the Diocese of Portsmouth
Defunct schools in Reading, Berkshire
1931 establishments in England
Educational institutions disestablished in 2010
2010 disestablishments in England